Woh Din Yaad Karo is a 1971 Bollywood family drama film directed by K. Amarnath. The film stars Sanjay Khan and Nanda.

Cast
Sanjay Khan ... Ajay / Raja  
Nanda ... Tara 
Shashikala ... Rajkumari / Saroj  
Mehmood ... Pyarelal / Kalluram / Nachappa   
Tun Tun as Chandabai
Madan Puri as Madan
Wasti as Jamnadas
Dhumal as Dularis' father/Advocate
Rajan Haksar as Gupta
Malika as dulari
Murad as Major/ Tara's father

Soundtrack
The music was composed by Laxmikant–Pyarelal while the lyrics were penned by Anand Bakshi

"Maine Chand Dekha Hai" - Mohammed Rafi
"Yaar Jinhe Tum Bhul Gaye Ho (Male)" - Mohammed Rafi
"Yaar Jinhe Tum Bhul Gaye Ho (Female)" - Lata Mangeshkar
"Hoy Aasamaan Se Tod Ke Taare Zulf Men Teri" - Kishore Kumar, Sulakshana Pandit
"Mohabbat Ki Kahaniyan" - Talat Mahmood, Lata Mangeshkar
"Baitha Bairi Banke Saiyyan" - Mohammed Rafi, Suman Kalyanpur

References

External links
 

1971 films
Films scored by Laxmikant–Pyarelal
1970s Hindi-language films
1971 drama films
Films directed by K. Amarnath